NGC 5882 is a small planetary nebula in the southern constellation of Lupus, positioned about 1.5° to the southwest of the star Epsilon Lupi. It was discovered by English astronomer John Herschel on July 2, 1834 from the Cape of Good Hope observatory. John L. E. Dreyer described it as "very small, round, quite sharp".

This nebular region consists of the cast-off outer atmosphere of an aging star. It is roughly elliptical in shape with several clumps of ionized material, and is surrounded by a larger region of low-level emission that extends for three times the nominal diameter of the main nebula. The inner shell has what appears to be multiple bubble-like shapes. The clumps in the outer shell may be the result of instabilities.

The elemental abundances of the nebula are very similar to those in the Sun, except for a times two enrichment of nitrogen. The latter suggests that the central star did not go through second dredge-up. The central star has an apparent visual magnitude of 13.43. It shines with 830 times the luminosity of the Sun and has 22.7% of the Sun's radius. It is displaced slightly from the center of symmetry for the nebula.

References

External links 
 

Planetary nebulae
Lupus (constellation)
5882